Spinnaker Island, within Lake Burley Griffin, is located in Canberra, Australian Capital Territory, Australia. In total there are six islands in the lake, but only three are named.

Spinnaker Island and Springbank Island are both located in the West Basin of the lake. The West Basin extends from the Commonwealth Avenue Bridge to Acton Peninsula.

In 2010, invasive exotic vegetation were found on the island, requiring a controlled burn-off for their removal and to reduce the presence of weeds.

See also

List of islands of Australia

References

Geography of Canberra
Islands of the Australian Capital Territory
Lake islands of Australia